Biegno is a village in the comune of Maccagno con Pino e Veddasca in the Province of Varese in Italy.  In 2001 it had a population of 90.

References

External links
Lombardia Beni Culturali - Biegno

Cities and towns in Lombardy